Farhat Square (Sahat Farhat) is one of the oldest squares in the Syrian city of Aleppo. It is located in the old Jdeydeh District, outside the historic walls of the Ancient City of Aleppo.

Farhat Square is a symbolic area of Christianity in Aleppo as three cathedrals are located there: Greek Catholic, Armenian and Maronite. Churches have been in the area since the 15th Century.

It was named after Bishop Gabriel Germanos Farhat (1670-1732) who was Maronite Bishop of Aleppo between 1725-1732 and founded the Maronite Library of Aleppo.  Sahat Farhat was named in his honor and his statue was placed in the square in 1932 to commemorate the 200th anniversary of his death.

The square and the buildings around it have been damaged by heavy fighting between combatants during the Battle of Aleppo (2012–16).  Similar destruction occurred to the area during Aleppo's sectarian unrest of 1850.

Gallery

See also
Ancient City of Aleppo
Jdeideh (Aleppo)
Churches of Judayde
St. Elijah Cathedral, Aleppo
Forty Martyrs Cathedral
Church of the Dormition of Our Lady
Massacre of Aleppo (1850)

References

Aleppo
Jdeydeh quarter
Squares in Aleppo
Tourist attractions in Syria